The Or Yarok Association for Safer Driving in Israel, known simply as Or Yarok (“Green light”)), is a not-for-profit traffic safety lobbyist organization dedicated to reducing road accidents in Israel through education, enforcement and improvement of infrastructure.

Established in 1997 by road-safety activist Avi Naor, Or Yarok made headlines in late-2010 with their radio and billboard campaign which denounced Israeli Transportation Minister Israel Katz for increasing rates of traffic fatalities in Israel.

Programs
Operating with over 5,000 national volunteers, Or Yarok conducts a series of programs intended to improve Israeli driving culture and traffic-law enforcement.

Besides general community-outreach activities, Or Yarok maintains a research division that studies and reports on the state of traffic safety in Israel. One of the more notable reports released by Or Yarok was a scathing critique on local governments after Israel was found to have the highest traffic fatality rate in the modern world for children aged 14 and under.

See also
 Politics of Israel

References

External links
Official site 

Non-profit organizations based in Israel
Road safety organizations